Stephanodaphne is a genus of flowering plants belonging to the family Thymelaeaceae.

Its native range is Comoros, Madagascar.

Species:

Stephanodaphne boivinii 
Stephanodaphne cremostachya 
Stephanodaphne cuspidata 
Stephanodaphne geminata 
Stephanodaphne humbertii 
Stephanodaphne pedicellata 
Stephanodaphne perrieri 
Stephanodaphne pilosa 
Stephanodaphne schatzii

References

Thymelaeaceae
Malvales genera